was a Japanese botanist. In 1919 and 1930 he published papers on the plants of Japan and Korea, including the genus Cephalotaxus. During the Japanese occupation of the (former) Dutch East Indies (now: Indonesia) Takenoshin Nakai was between 1943 and 1945 the director of 's Lands Plantentuin in Batavia (now: Bogor Botanical Gardens in Bogor.

Taxonomist
The International Plant Names Index lists 4,733 records of plant names of which Nakai is an author or co-author.

References

Bibliography

External links
 Lecture notes on angiosperms from University of Maryland
 Article on the Korean bellflower
 Article on Abeliophyllum distichum by Yong Shik Kim and Mike Maunder from CURTIS'S Botanical Magazine, Royal Botanic Gardens, Kew, UK. Vol. 15(2): 141–146, 1998.
 Takenoshin Nakai 1882-1952 by Hiroshi Hara

20th-century Japanese botanists

 01
1882 births
1952 deaths
Botanists active in Japan

Japanese taxonomists